4 3 2 1 is a novel by Paul Auster published in January 2017. At the time of its publication, it was the first new Auster novel to have appeared in seven years. Auster worked on the book seven days a week for three years and wrote it in long hand. At 866 pages, the novel is much longer than any of his previous works. In September 2017 it was shortlisted for the 2017 Man Booker Prize.

Plot summary
The novel is the story of Archie Ferguson told at four different times, and in four different versions. Each of the seven chapters in the book is divided into four parts (1.1, 1.2, 1.3, 1.4, 2.1... etc) which represent the different versions of his life. Ferguson (as he's known in the book) grows up with the same Jewish, middle class parents, Stanley and Rose, as well as many of the same friends, including Amy Schneiderman, his girlfriend/friend. However, the relationships change with each Ferguson version. Due to the individual circumstances, his lives take very different paths.  The story follows his home life as well as college years, his love life and political ideas. Depending on the version of his life, Ferguson experiences various identity issues. The story is set in  Newark, New Jersey, New York City, Paris and London in the 1950s and 1960s. As Archie grows through young adulthood, events such as the Vietnam war, Civil Rights, the Kennedy election and assassination, and white flight from Newark are covered.

Reception
At the time of its publication in January and February 2017, the book received mixed reviews, and with widely divergent opinions. Tom Perrotta of the New York Times wrote “4 3 2 1 is a work of outsize ambition and remarkable craft, a monumental assemblage of competing and complementary fictions, a novel that contains multitudes." Michelle Dean, writing for the Los Angeles Times, was harshly critical of the book's execution, referring to it as a "slog", a "doorstopper" and a "bad joke". On the other hand, in The Seattle Times, David Takami praised Auster's execution as "brilliantly conceived", a "brilliant compendium of the tumultuous 1960s", with many "descriptive gems" too numerous to name: 
The novel reached #13 on the February 19, 2017 New York Times Best Seller list.

References

External links

Reviews
 
 
 
 
 
 
 
 
 
 
 
 

2017 American novels
Novels set in New York City
Henry Holt and Company books
Novels set in New Jersey
Novels by Paul Auster
Postmodern novels
Faber and Faber books